Macrospectrodes is a genus of moths of the family Crambidae. It contains only one species, Macrospectrodes subargentalis, which is found in India (Sikkim).

References

Natural History Museum Lepidoptera genus database

Pyraustinae
Crambidae genera
Taxa named by William Warren (entomologist)
Monotypic moth genera